Antoine Le Roux de Lincy (Paris, 22 August 1806 – Paris, 13 May 1869) was a 19th-century French librarian, romanist and medievalist.

After graduating from the École Nationale des Chartes (promotion 1831-1832), Le Roux was appointed at the bibliothèque de l'Arsenal. He also was secretary of the Société des bibliophiles français.

Publications (selection) 
 With Francisque Michel: Recueil de farces, moralités et sermons joyeux, 4 Bde., Paris 1831-1838, Genf 1977
 Analyse critique et littéraire du roman de Garin-le-Lohérain, précédée de quelques observations sur l’origine des romans de chevalerie, Paris 1835
 Le Roman de Brut, par Wace, poète du XIIe siècle, publié pour la première fois, 2 Bde., Rouen 1836-1838
 Essai historique et littéraire sur l’Abbaye de Fécamp, Rouen 1840
 Les quatre livres des rois, Paris 1841
 Les cent nouvelles nouvelles, 2 Bde., Paris 1841
 Recueil de chants historiques français depuis le XIIe jusqu’au XVIIIe siècle, 2 Bde., Paris 1841–1842, Genf 1969
 Le Livre des proverbes français, Paris 1842, Paris 1996 (Vorwort von Pierre Boutang); 2. Auflage (« précédé de recherches historiques sur les proverbes français et leur emploi dans la littérature du moyen âge et de la renaissance »), Paris 1859, Genf 1968
 Histoire de l’Hôtel de ville de Paris, Paris 1846
 Les femmes célèbres de l’ancienne France, Paris 1848, 1858
 L’Heptaméron des nouvelles de Marguerite d’Angoulême, 3 Bde., Paris 1853-1854; (with Anatole de Montaiglon), 4 vol., Paris 1880, Genf 1969
 Description de la ville de Paris au XVe siècle, par Guillebert de Metz, Paris 1855
 Chants historiques et populaires du temps de Charles VII et de Louis XI, Paris 1857, 1867
Vie de la reine Anne de Bretagne, 4 Bde., Paris 1860
Recherches sur Jean Grolier, sur sa vie et sa bibliothèque, Paris 1866, Nieuwkoop 1970 (englisch: New York 1907)
 With Lazare-Maurice Tisserand: Paris et ses historiens aux XIVe et XVe siècles, Paris 1867 (Auszug, Caen 1992)

Bibliography 
 Adolf Birch-Hirschfeld: Leroux de Lincy (Adrian Jean Victor), in: Johann Samuel Ersch, Johann Gottfried Gruber (Hrsg.): Allgemeine Encyclopädie der Wissenschaften und Künste, 2. Sektion, 43. Teil (1889), p. 209.

External links 
 Antoine Le Roux de Lincy on data.bnf.fr
 Antoine Le Roux de Lincy on Wiki source

French librarians
École Nationale des Chartes alumni
19th-century French historians
French medievalists
Writers from Paris
1806 births
1869 deaths